Villarino Partido is a partido in the south of Buenos Aires Province in Argentina.

Settlements

Argerich   
Colonia Monte La Plata
Colonia San Adolfo  
Hilario Ascasubi  
Juan Cousté  (Estacion Algarrobo)
Mayor Buratovich
Médanos
Pedro Luro
Teniente Origone

Famous residents
Mario Davidovsky Musician

External links

 Municipal Site
 Geographical Data
Satellite Image of Médanos

States and territories established in 1886
Partidos of Buenos Aires Province